Sinokrot Holding is the largest family-owned business group in the Palestinian territories, established in 1982. It is based in Ramallah, operating in 20,000 m2 of buildings with 350 employees.

The company sells from more than 4,000 outlets. The chairman, Mazen  Tawfiq Sinokrot, who was a Minister of National Economy until March 2006, as well as Chairman of the Board for the Palestine Standards Institute, Palestine Investment and Promotion Agency, and Palestine Industrial Zones and Free Zones Authority.

The Sinokrot family has worked in food products since 1982, when the company began manufacturing candies, chocolate, and other confectioneries in its first Ramallah factory. Sinokrot has also established the following ventures:

 Sinokrot Cold chain company
 Sinokrot Global For Markets Development Company
 ZADONA Agro-Industrial Co.
 Pal Gardens Agriculture Company
 Sinokrot For Markets Development Company - Jerusalem
 Capital Gate Consulting Services Company

References

External links
 www.sinokrotholding.com

 Companies established in 1982
 Companies based in the State of Palestine